Zeugiteae is a tribe of the subfamily Panicoideae in the grasses (Poaceae), native to Africa, Asia, Australasia, South and Central America. There are 18 species in four genera. The tribe belongs to a basal lineage within the subfamily. Species in this tribe use the C3 photosynthetic pathway.

Genera
Chevalierella
Lophatherum
Orthoclada
Zeugites (syn. Calderonella, Pohlidium)

References

External links

Panicoideae
Poaceae tribes